The University of Pennsylvania School of Veterinary Medicine, commonly referred to as Penn Vet was founded in 1884. It has two campuses; the main campus is located in Philadelphia, and a second campus is located in Kennett Square, Pennsylvania.  At the Philadelphia campus, first-, second-, and third-year veterinary students attend classes.  It is also the home to numerous research facilities as well as the Matthew J. Ryan Veterinary Hospital, a veterinary teaching hospital. The school's second campus, New Bolton Center, is located on some 700 acres of rural Chester County, Pennsylvania, is home to the George D. Widener Hospital for Large Animals.  

Over 6,000 veterinarians have graduated from the school, the only veterinary school in Pennsylvania. The school awards the Veterinariae Medicinae Doctoris (VMD) degree rather than a Doctor of Veterinary Medicine (DVM).  It also offers a VMD-PhD program, a VMD-MBA, and a VMD-MPH program.

Penn Vet is the only veterinary school in the United States that was a direct outgrowth of the University's School of Medicine in this case Penn Med. 

Since 1935, Penn Vet has offered courses for advanced work in veterinary pathology leading to master and doctoral degrees in conjunction with and cooperation by Penn Med.

Notable Alumni

Gallery

See also
 Veterinary medicine in the United States

References

External links
 

Veterinary Medicine
Educational institutions established in 1884
Veterinary schools in the United States
1884 establishments in Pennsylvania